"Believer" is a song recorded by electronic music group Major Lazer, alongside Dutch production duo Showtek. It was released to digital download on September 30, 2016, through record labels Mad Decent and Skink. The song also samples vocals from Caribbean band Freetown Collective on their song "Good Swimma", who collaborated with record producer Q Major in that track. Inspired by the story of Prahlada who was a firm believer and worshiper of Lord Vishnu. He was thrown from the valley into a river and then was thrown into fire. Nothing could kill him because Lord Vishnu always saved him.

Background
Major Lazer and Showtek premiered the song in their set list under the name of "I'm a Believer" in April 2016. It was announced on September 26 that the song would be released as "Believer" on September 30.

Music video
A video was directed by Christopher Louie, director of the EDM film XOXO and uploaded on January 3, 2017. Louie stated the video was inspired by the images of Omran Daqneesh, the Syrian boy whose home was bombed at night. "Like everyone in the world I was heartbroken by that image, but I also saw a glimmer of hope,” Louie said in a press release -- “As dark as the subject matter is, the point of our 'Believer' video was to capture the resilience of youth and the hope displayed by communities coming together to save victims from the rubble.” 

The video has been tied to the Save the Children organization with a link to donate in the description box.

Charts

Certifications

Release history

References

2016 songs
2016 singles
Major Lazer songs
Showtek songs
Songs written by Diplo
Songs written by Jr Blender